Jiang Dengxuan (188025 November, 1925), courtesy name Chao Liu (|p=Chāo liù) was a Chinese general and politician during the Warlord Era, most famous for his service in Zhang Zuolin's Fengtian Army.

Early life and education
Jiang was born into a wealthy family of landlords and businessmen. He did well in the early stages of the imperial examination system, but China's defeat in the Boxer Rebellion motivated him to become a soldier. In 1903, he went to Japan to study military science. During this period, he was influenced by early Chinese nationalists Huang Xing and Song Jiaoren, and joined Sun Yat-sen's Tongmenghui the year it was founded. In 1908, he graduated from the Artillery Department of the Imperial Japanese Army Academy.

Career

Zhu Qinglan's right-hand man
Upon returning to China, he served in a military patrol under Zhu Qinglan in Fengtian province. Zhu appreciated his talent, and took him with him when he was transferred to Sichuan. There, Jiang served as a second-class staff officer in the 33rd Mixed Combination Association of the Army and in the general office of the Sichuan Army Preparatory School. In 1911, the Sichuan Railway Protection Movement broke out on the eve of the Wuchang Uprising, and Governor Zhao Erfeng was forced to step down. Zhu was appointed deputy governor in a military government with Jiang as his chief of staff. Zhu's troops mutinied and both men left the province.

In 1912 Jiang served as an instructor at the Baoding Military Academy, and the next year was made chief of staff for the 1st Division of the Guizhou Army. In November 1913, Zhu Qinglan became Governor of Heilongjiang and once again made Jiang his chief of staff. In December, Jiang was awarded the rank of Major General. In May 1914, Yuan Shikai loyalist Xu Lanzhou used his superior military force to make Zhu resign, and Jiang followed suit. In 1916, Zhu served as the governor of Guangdong, and Jiang served as his assistant. There, Jiang helped settle the fighting between local warlords Long Jiguang and Lu Rongting. In 1917, Zhu Qinglan resigned as governor of Guangdong. Jiang Dengxuan was recalled by the Beiyang government and served as a military advisor to the presidential palace.

Fengtian general
In 1922, Jiang Dengxuan became a commander in the Fengtian Army. During the army's retreat from its defeat in the First Zhili-Fengtian War, Jiang personally went into battle and oversaw the construction of a defensive line that saved the army from further destruction. This won him praise from Zhang Zuolin and Jiang was placed in charge of reorganizing and re-equipping the army. Jiang played a major role in the rebuilding of the Fengtian Army that took place between the First and Second Zhili-Fengtian Wars. 

During the Second Zhili-Fengtian War in 1924, Jiang served as the commander of the 1st Fengtian Army. Along with the Third Army under Zhang Xueliang, Jiang was tasked with taking the Shanhai Pass on the road to Beijing. Here the Fengtian forces faced Zhili's First, Second, and Third Route Armies encamped behind strong defensive lines. From when fighting began on September 29th until the end of the first week of October, Jiang and Zhang's attacks were repulsed. However, Jiang's second-in-command Han Lichun was able to break through the Jiumenkou passes to the north and the Zhili flank was turned. In the subsequent fighting for the railway near Shimenzhai, Jiang and Han led from the front. The close-quarters combat was brutal and the Zhili forces slowly began to push the Fengtian Army back on the 18th and 19th of October. During the battle, Han attempted to dismiss an artillery officer serving under Guo Songling. Incensed, Guo withdrew his eight regiments from the battle lines at Jiumenkou, threatening the entire Fengtian position. It was only Zhang Xueliang's speedy intervention which soothed Guo and convinced him to return to the front before the Zhili forces could discover the opening.

After the end of the war, Jiang and Guo both agreed that the warlord armies should be disarmed in order to bring peace to China. They suggested this to the parties negotiating at the Tianjin Conference, but their proposals were not adopted.

In August 1925, Jiang was appointed as the commander of the suppression of bandits in Jiangsu and Anhui, and the supervisor of military affairs in Anhui. He was attacked by the Zhili-aligned warlord Sun Chuanfang and retreated to Shandong, where he joined forces with Zhang Zongchang. However, Sun Chuanfang defeated both of them solidly. Jiang subsequently returned to Manchuria to serve as the commander of the Fengtian 4th Front Army.

Death and legacy
On 22 November 1925, Jiang's fellow officer Guo Songling launched an anti-Zhang Zuolin mutiny. Jiang Dengxuan drove through Luanzhou Station, intending to negotiate with Guo, but was detained after entering the city. Guo Li tried to persuade Jiang to join him and oppose Zhang, but Jiang instead scolded him for insubordination. Guo ordered him executed, and he was shot on November 26 at the age of 46.

Today, the Jiang Dengxuan stele is a city-level protected cultural site in Xingtai.

Notes

References

Bibliography

1880 births
1925 deaths
Executed Republic of China people
Tongmenghui members
Chinese nationalists
19th-century Chinese people
20th-century Chinese people
20th-century Chinese military personnel
Members of the Fengtian clique
Republic of China warlords from Hubei